Dr. Mani Kumar Sharma is an Indian politician. He was elected to the Sikkim Legislative Assembly from Khamdong-Singtam in the 2019 Sikkim Legislative Assembly election as a member of the Sikkim Krantikari Morcha. He is the Minister of Healthcare, Human Services & Family Welfare, Social Justice & Empowerment in the P. S. Golay Cabinet.

References

1976 births
Living people
Sikkim Krantikari Morcha politicians
People from Gangtok district
Sikkim MLAs 2019–2024
Utkal University alumni